Nycteola svecicus is a moth belonging to the family Nolidae. The species was first described by Felix Bryk in 1941.

It is native to Northern Europe.

References

Chloephorinae